Kentucky Route 842 is a  state highway in Kentucky. Although listed as an east–west route in Kentucky Transportation Cabinet route logs, KY 842 follows a north–south arc between its termini. The southern terminus of the route is at U.S. Route 25 (US 25) in Florence. The northern terminus is at KY 236 in Erlanger.

Route description
KY 842 begins at an intersection with US 25 and Richardson Road, the unnumbered eastern continuation of KY 842, in Florence. KY 841 heads west as Weaver Road, crossing Interstate 71 (I-71) and  I-75 with no access. Weaver Road, a mostly residential road with a few industries, as well as KY 842, then turns to the northwest to intersect US 42/US 127, where it becomes Hopeful Church Road. Hopeful Church Road, like Weaver Road, is mostly a residential road, connecting US 42/US 127 to KY 18. At KY 18, KY 842 changes names for the final time, becoming Houston Road. Located along Houston Road are many different restaurants plus many large stores. KY 842 continues northeast through Florence, intersecting I-71/I-75 before terminating at KY 236 in Erlanger.

Major intersections

References

External links

0842
Transportation in Boone County, Kentucky
Transportation in Kenton County, Kentucky